Phinney Bay is a small bay, 0.8 miles long, near and just off the north end of the Port Washington Narrows in the Kitsap Peninsula in western Washington, USA. The city of Bremerton is just south of the bay and West Bremerton is just north of the bay.

The Bremerton Yacht Club has its moorage with floats on the west side of the bay.

External links
 Bremerton Yacht Club

Bays of Washington (state)
Bays of Kitsap County, Washington